A. Paul "The Round Mound of Come Around" Savage (born June 25, 1947 in Toronto, Ontario) is a Canadian curler, world champion and Olympic medallist.

Career 
In 1983 he played third for Ed Werenich's team when they won the Labatt Brier and then won the 1983 World Men's Championship as Team Canada. He received a silver medal at the 1998 Winter Olympics in Nagano with the Mike Harris rink, where he was the substitute. He is considered to be one of the best left-handers to play the game.

Savage made seven appearances at the Brier, the Canadian men's national championship, between 1970 and 1988, five times as skip of the Ontario rink and twice as third. He was named to the Canadian Curling Hall of Fame in 1988.

In 2009, Savage and the rest of his 1983 world champion team, which included Werenich, John Kawaja and Neil Harrison were inducted into the Ontario Sports Hall of Fame.

Personal life 
He lives in Markham, Ontario.

Savage has a tattoo showing a curling stone nested inside the Canadian flag, which he got before the 1998 Nagano Olympics. In 2002 he made a cameo appearance in the curling comedy Men With Brooms, playing a television announcer.

References

External links
 

1947 births
Brier champions
Curlers at the 1998 Winter Olympics
Living people
Medalists at the 1998 Winter Olympics
Olympic curlers of Canada
Olympic medalists in curling
Olympic silver medalists for Canada
Curlers from Toronto
World curling champions
Canadian male curlers
20th-century Canadian people